Emurena is a genus of moths in the family Erebidae.

Species
Emurena fernandezi
Emurena lurida
Emurena luridoides
Emurena quinquepunctata
Emurena tripunctata

References

Natural History Museum Lepidoptera generic names catalog

Phaegopterina
Moth genera